Nemesis is a work of detective fiction by Agatha Christie (1890–1976) and first published in the UK by the Collins Crime Club in November 1971 and in the US by Dodd, Mead and Company later in the same year. The UK edition retailed at £1.50 and the US edition at $6.95. It was the last Miss Marple novel the author wrote, although Sleeping Murder was the last Miss Marple novel to be published.

Miss Marple first encounters Jason Rafiel in A Caribbean Mystery, where they solve a mystery. In his will, Rafiel leaves another mystery for Miss Marple to solve.

Nemesis received generally positive reviews at the time of publication. It was described as "astonishingly fresh" with a "devilish fine" confrontation and overall was "quite worthy of the Picasso of the detective story". It is a "first-rate story" in a "traditional detective novel". The novel is "readable and ingenious" and "Miss Christie remains unflagging" at age 80. A later review by Barnard is the only negative note, stating "The garden paths we are led up are neither enticing nor profitable," and Barnard rates Christie's later novels generally not as good as earlier ones.

Recent analyses of the plot and characters in this novel find homosexual themes, but the character "Miss Marple seems to view the passionate friendship between women as just a phase in their life", which was "a conventional view, held by people of Marple's generation and social class.

Plot summary
Miss Marple receives a letter from the solicitors of the recently deceased Jason Rafiel, a millionaire whom she had met during a holiday on which she had encountered a murder, which asks her to look into an unspecified crime; if she succeeds in solving the crime, she will inherit £20,000. Rafiel has left her few clues. She begins by joining a tour of famous British houses and gardens with fifteen other people, arranged by Mr Rafiel prior to his death. Elizabeth Temple is the retired school headmistress who relates the story of Verity, who was engaged to Rafiel's ne'er-do-well son, Michael, but the marriage did not happen. Another member of the tour group, Miss Cooke, is a woman she had met briefly in St Mary Mead.

Her next clue comes from Lavinia Glynne; Rafiel had written to Mrs Glynne and her two sisters before his death, suggesting Miss Marple spend the most physically challenging few days of the tour with them at the Old Manor House. Miss Marple accepts Lavinia's invitation. She then meets Lavinia's spinster sisters, Clotilde and Anthea Bradbury-Scott. Touring the grounds, Miss Marple notices a creeping plant about to bloom, polygonum baldschuanicum covering the wreck of the greenhouse. On talking with the servant, Miss Marple learns Verity joined the family after both her parents died, becoming quite attached to Clotilde. Verity is dead now, brutally murdered. Michael Rafiel is in prison.

On the morning of her return to her party, Miss Marple learns Miss Temple had been injured by a rockslide during the previous day's hike, and was lying in a coma in hospital. The group stays over an extra night to wait for news from the tour guide about Miss Temple's health. Professor Wanstead, a pathologist and psychologist interested in criminal brains, had been instructed by Mr Rafiel to go on the tour. He had examined Michael Rafiel at the request of the head of the prison where Michael was incarcerated; he came to the conclusion Michael was not capable of murder. He tells Miss Marple how distant Michael's father seemed, yet wanting justice. He mentions a missing young local woman, Nora Broad, and he fears she will be found murdered. Wanstead takes Miss Marple to see Miss Temple; in a moment of consciousness, Miss Temple had asked for Miss Marple. Miss Temple wakes long enough to tell Miss Marple to "search for Verity Hunt", and dies that night. The three sisters extend their invitation to Miss Marple when she decides not to return to the tour, and she promptly accepts. That night, Mrs Glynne tells the story of Verity in their household to Miss Marple.

After the inquiry into Miss Temple's death, Miss Marple is visited by Archdeacon Brabazon, a friend of Miss Temple. He tells Miss Marple he was going to marry Verity Hunt and Michael Rafiel in a secret ceremony. While he disapproved of the secrecy and worried about their prospects, he agreed to marry them because he could see they were in love. He was most surprised when neither turned up for the wedding, nor sent a note. Miss Marple stays another night with the three sisters when the tour moves on. Professor Wanstead travels to London by train on an errand for Miss Marple. Miss Barrow and Miss Cooke decide they will visit a nearby church. Later that evening, Miss Marple talks with the sisters about what she thinks may have happened and, while they are doing so, Miss Barrow and Miss Cooke appear, to talk to Miss Marple. They stay for a time and are then invited back for coffee that evening.

As they talk about Miss Temple, Miss Marple suggests, albeit dissembling, Joanna Crawford and Emlyn Price (two of those on the tour) pushed the boulder, and their alibis are mere fabrication. As they get ready to leave, Miss Cooke suggests the coffee would not suit Miss Marple, as it will keep her up all night. Clotilde then offers some warm milk. The two ladies soon depart, although each returns to retrieve a forgotten item. At three o'clock in the morning, Clotilde enters Miss Marple's room, surprised when Miss Marple turns on the light. Miss Marple tells her she did not drink the milk. Clotilde offers to warm it up, but Miss Marple tells her she still would not drink it because she knows Clotilde killed Verity Hunt and buried her body in the wreck of the greenhouse, because she could not bear Verity leaving her for someone else. She also knows Clotilde brutally murdered Nora Broad to (mis)identify her body as Verity's and thus throw suspicion on Michael Rafiel. Clotilde murdered Miss Temple as well. As Clotilde advances toward her, Miss Marple blows on a whistle, which brings Miss Cooke and Miss Barrow to her defence — they are bodyguards employed by Mr Rafiel to protect Miss Marple. Clotilde drinks the milk herself, which is poisoned. Miss Marple tells the story to the Home Secretary, including that Verity is buried on the property of the Bradbury-Scotts. Michael Rafiel is set free. Miss Marple collects her inheritance, confident she completed the task given her.

Characters
Miss Marple: Single woman who is getting frail with age, a natural detective. She takes on a request from Jason Rafiel, with little initial information, to solve an unnamed crime for him.
Jason Rafiel: Millionaire, recently deceased, who first met Miss Marple in A Caribbean Mystery.
Michael Rafiel: Son of Jason, still a suspect of murder; Jason considers his son a ne'er do well.
Esther Walters: Mr Rafiel's secretary, who first met Miss Marple in A Caribbean Mystery.
Verity Hunt: Engaged to Michael Rafiel years ago, but the marriage never happened; she was found murdered, identified by Clotilde Bradbury-Scott.
Miss Elizabeth Temple: Retired headmistress of the school that Verity Hunt attended, who shares the story of Verity Hunt's engagement with Miss Marple, as they both take the tour of famous houses and gardens. She is injured by a rock slide while Miss Marple takes her day of rest, and dies the next day.
Miss Cooke: Young woman in the tour group, who Miss Marple recalls seeing near her home before the tour; later revealed to be sent on the tour by Jason Rafiel, to aid and protect Miss Marple.
Miss Barrow: One of the fifteen on the tour; she appears with Miss Cooke for the protection of Miss Marple.
Lavinia Glynne: A widow, and one of the three sisters Bradbury-Scott, who live along the tour route, near the point where the garden to be toured is a taxing walk for a frail woman; the sisters were contacted by Jason Rafiel to invite Miss Marple to stay with them until the tour would move on.
Clotilde Bradbury-Scott: Unmarried elder sister of Lavinia who became attached to Verity Hunt, who was sent to live with the three sisters when her parents died.
Anthea Bradbury-Scott: Unmarried younger sister of Lavinia and Clotilde.
Professor Wanstead: One of the fifteen people on the tour with Miss Marple, also at Jason Rafiel's invitation. He is a psychiatrist who examined Michael Rafiel. Wanstead judges Michael as incapable of murder.
Archdeacon Brabazon: A friend of Miss Temple who tells Miss Marple that he had agreed to officiate at the secret marriage of Michael and Verity. That is an unusual procedure for him, a secret marriage, but he judged them to be truly in love with each other.
Joanna Crawford: Young woman on the tour with her aunt.
Emlyn Price: Young man on the tour.
Nora Broad: Local girl in the area of the Bradbury-Scott home whose body is disfigured making identification difficult.

Literary significance and reception
Matthew Coady in The Guardian of 4 November 1971 concluded, "Not a Christie classic but the old hand is astonishingly fresh and the mixture as relaxing as a hot bath."

Maurice Richardson in The Observer of 31 October 1971 said of Miss Marple in this story, "The showdown when, alone in bed, quite defenceless with not even a knitting-needle, she is confronted by a brawny great fiend of a butch, is devilish fine. Not one of her best, perhaps, but remarkably inventive, quite worthy of the Picasso of the detective story."

The Daily Mirror of 28 October 1971 said, "With this first-rate story Dame Agatha triumphantly returns to the traditional detective novel after a spell of psychological suspense."

Robert Weaver in the Toronto Daily Star of 4 December 1971 said, "Christie richly deserves the loyalty offered up to her by devotees of the traditional mystery. She is readable and ingenious, and in Nemesis she has going for her the amateur lady sleuth Miss Jane Marple deep in a murder case as she tries to carry out a request that comes in effect from beyond the grave. Beyond 80 Miss Christie remains unflagging."

Robert Barnard commented about the plot that "Miss Marple is sent on a tour of stately gardens by Mr Rafiel." His generally negative view of the novel was tersely expressed in one sentence: "The garden paths we are led up are neither enticing nor profitable. All the usual strictures about late Christie apply."

Homosexual themes
The novel deals with the illicit and unspoken nature of "female love". Clotilde Bradbury-Scott is depicted as an elderly gentlewoman, living with her two sisters. Upon meeting Clotilde, Miss Marple senses Clotilde's real nature. Yet Marple seems blinded from seeing the truth in this case, due to her own expectations concerning gender.

Marple thinks to herself that Clotilde "would have made a magnificent Clytemnestra---she could have stabbed a husband in his bath with exultation." Yet, she dismisses this thought. Clotilde has never married, and Marple thinks Clotilde incapable of murdering anyone but her version of Agamemnon. In the novel, Clotilde has murdered her own beloved one, to prevent the young woman from leaving Clotilde to "live with a man and have children, marriage, and normality.

Christie links the perceived deviance of lesbianism to the deviant behaviour of murder. Yet Clotilde is depicted as being passionate in her love. This passion both prevents her from disfiguring Verity's corpse, and shields her from suffering any real grief about Verity's death.

The identity of the murderer was intended to confound Christie's typical readers. Clotilde Bradbury-Scott is depicted as a respectable spinster. Yet she is revealed to have killed her young ward Verity Hunt, with the combined motivation of love and jealousy. The love between Clotilde and Verity is never fully explored, as Christie typically devoted minimal development and exposure to passionate relationships in her works.

In her conclusion, Miss Marple seems to view the passionate friendship between women as just a phase in their life. A phase destined to end when one of the women chooses a male lover instead. This was a choice typically open to the younger woman in the same-sex relationship. This was a conventional view, held by people of Marple's generation and social class. Christie's works in general imply that women have an "imperative need for and right to full sexual experience". Yet Christie (in this novel) does not even entertain the possibility that a lesbian relationship could be just as fulfilling as a heterosexual one.

In the novel, Verity eventually rejected Clotilde in favour of Michael Rafiel. The wisdom of this choice is not really questioned. Miss Marple herself acknowledges that Michael "has never been any good", and that he had little chance of ever reforming, though he has been convicted wrongfully of the murder. Yet Marple seems convinced that Michael was the right man for "the young, beautiful, innocent, and good" Verity, perhaps because he could offer her sexual fulfilment and children. Michael is thus depicted as a superior choice as a romantic partner to Clotilde. The same Clotilde depicted as noble and intelligent, and loving Verity more than anyone or anything in the world. Clotilde is the only character who refused to accept Verity's natural preference for men.

Verity is not the only one murdered by Clotilde. The other victim is Nora Broad, an attractive working class girl. Clotilde offers Nora "seductive gifts" and acts of friendship, but proceeds to brutally murder her. When asked to identify Nora's corpse, Clotilde falsely identifies her as Verity. This is repeating a pattern from The Body in the Library  (1942). In both cases, a person is contacted by the police and asked to identify a corpse. In both cases, the person has secret motivations and intentionally makes a false identification. While the police investigate the murder of the upper-class Verity, Nora's disappearance is not investigated. The police consider her just another "promiscuous" girl who did not inform her family that she was running away with a man.

Film, TV or theatrical adaptations

Television

BBC adaptation
In 1987, Nemesis was broadcast by the BBC in two 50-minute parts on Sunday, 8 February, and Sunday, 15 February 1987. It was the eighth adaptation (of twelve) in the series Miss Marple starring Joan Hickson as Miss Marple. It deviates quite significantly from the novel. Miss Temple is killed by a stone bust pushed off a balcony while she tours a library rather than by a rock slide during a hike, Michael Rafiel is not sent to prison for Verity's death as he was never charged due to lack of proof and instead is seen living on the streets, and Nora Broad's name is changed to Norah Brent. A new fictional nephew/godson of Miss Marple, Lionel Peel, accompanies her; he is staying with her after his wife chucked him out. Also, the characters of Esther Walters, Emlyn Price and Joanna Crawford are removed.

At the time of the broadcast, the prequel story "A Caribbean Mystery" had not been produced or broadcast. The part of Jason Rafiel was eventually played by Donald Pleasence and not by Frank Gatliff who portrayed the character in this production.

Adaptor: Trevor Bowen
Director: David Tucker

Cast:
 Barbara Franceschi as Miss Kurnowitz
 Frank Gatliff as Jason Rafiel
 Peter Tilbury as Lionel Peel
 John Horsley as Professor Wanstead
 Jane Booker as Miss Cooke
 Alison Skilbeck as Miss Barrow
 Valerie Lush as Lavinia Glynne
 Margaret Tyzack as Clothilde Bradbury-Scott
 Anna Cropper as Anthea Bradbury-Scott
 Jonathan Adams as Carter
 Oliver Parker as London policeman
 Bruce Payne as Michael Rafiel
 Roger Hammond as Mr Broadribb
 Patrick Godfrey as Mr Schuster
 Joanna Hole as Madge
 Helen Cherry as Miss Temple
 Liz Fraser as Mrs Brent

ITV adaptation
In 2007, ITV broadcast Nemesis (aired 1 January 2009) with Geraldine McEwan as part of the third season of her Agatha Christie's Marple series. As with other adaptations made for this series, this version was only very loosely based on the novel, with the plot, motives and identity of most of the characters and scenes altered, almost everything about the character of the murderer substantially changed, and contemporary themes added (in particular, a lesbian subplot, as with several adaptations in the series).    

Sister Clotilde still murders Verity for deciding to leave the nunnery (and her) and marry Michael. She informs the Mother Superior that an unknown and heavily bandaged soldier has died, but covers Verity in bandages so she is buried as 'Ralph Collins'. When she sees a desperate woman's newspaper advert seeking her husband, Martin Waddy, who went missing in Dunkirk, Sister Clotilde tells the soldier (who has lost his memory) that he is Martin Waddy. She then presents him to the desperate wife, who accepts him. This deception is what leads to the other murders. Sister Clotilde commits suicide melodramatically with a statue saint's spear, and Ralph meets his real wife who has lived as a widow for eleven years.

Director: Nicolas Winding Refn
Cast:
 Laura Michelle Kelly as Verity Hunt/Margaret Lumley
 Dan Stevens as Michael Rafiel
 Richard E. Grant as Raymond West
 Amanda Burton as Sister Clotilde
 Anne Reid as Mother Agnes
 Ronni Ancona as Amanda Dalrymple
 Ruth Wilson as Georgina Barrow
 Lee Ingleby as Detective Constable Colin Hards
 Will Mellor as Martin Waddy
 Emily Woof as Rowena Waddy
 George Cole as Lawrence Raeburn
 Johnny Briggs as Sydney Lumley
 Adrian Rawlins as Derek Turnball
 Graeme Garden as Matthew Broadribb

Korean adaptation
The novel was also adapted as part of the 2018 Korean television series, Ms. Ma, Nemesis.

Radio
Nemesis was adapted for radio dramatisation by BBC Radio 4 starring June Whitfield. It first aired in November–December 1998 and again in later years, including 2011 and 2013.

 June Whitfield as Miss Marple
 George A. Cooper as Mr Rafiel
 David Swift as Professor Wanstead
 Louie Ramsay as Lavinia Glynne
 Thelma Barlow as Anthea Bradbury-Scott
 Mary Wimbush as Clotilde Bradbury-Scott
 Jill Balcon as Miss Temple
 Desmond Llewelyn as Archdeacon Brabazon
 Tricia Hitchcock as Miss Cooke
 Delia Lindsay as Miss Barrow
 Molly Gaisford as Joanna Crawford
 Jane Whittenshaw as Cherry
 Geoffrey Whitehead as Mr Broadribb

Publication history
 1971, Collins Crime Club (London), November 1971, Hardcover, 256 pp
 1971, Dodd Mead and Company (New York), Hardcover, 271 pp
 1973, Pocket Books (New York), Paperback, 229 pp
 1974, Fontana Books (Imprint of HarperCollins), Paperback, 192 pp
 1976, Ulverscroft Large-print Edition, Hardcover, 421 pp 
 2006, Marple Facsimile edition (Facsimile of 1971 UK first edition), 2 May 2006, Hardcover, 

The novel was first serialised in the UK weekly magazine Woman's Realm in seven abridged instalments from 25 September (Vol 27, No 702) to 6 November 1971 (Vol 27, No 708), with illustrations by Len Thurston. In North America the novel was serialised in the Star Weekly Novel, a Toronto newspaper supplement, in two abridged instalments from 16 to 23 October 1971, with each issue containing the same cover illustration by Laszlo Gal.

References

Bibliography

External links
Nemesis at the official Agatha Christie website
Nemesis at the new official Agatha Christie website

Analysis of novel by A N Wilson in The Daily Telegraph

1971 British novels
1970s LGBT novels
British novels adapted into films
Collins Crime Club books
Miss Marple novels
British novels adapted into television shows
Novels first published in serial form
Novels set in the United Kingdom
Works originally published in British magazines
Works originally published in women's magazines
Wrongful convictions in fiction
Novels with lesbian themes